Arctostaphylos parryana, with the common name Parry manzanita, is a species of manzanita.

Description 
Arctostaphylos parryana is an erect manzanita, standing on red-barked stems and reaching up to two meters in height. The leaves are bright green, generally oval in shape and pointed. The small pink-tinted white flowers are borne in densely bunched inflorescences. The fruit is a rounded drupe which contains two or more seeds which have fused into one body.

The fruit was a food of the Luiseño of Southern California.

Distribution
This shrub is endemic to California, where it grows in the western section of the Transverse Ranges, from coastal Santa Barbara County to the San Gabriel Mountains.

This is a manzanita of chaparral and low-elevation coniferous forest ecosystems.

See also
California chaparral and woodlands

External links

Calflora Database: Arctostaphylos parryana (Parry manzanita)
Jepson Manual Treatment - Arctostaphylos parryana
USDA Plants Profile; Arctostaphylos parryana
Ethnobotany
Arctostaphylos parryana - Photo gallery

parryana
Endemic flora of California
Natural history of the California chaparral and woodlands
Natural history of the Peninsular Ranges
Natural history of the Transverse Ranges
~
Flora without expected TNC conservation status